is a city located in Fukuoka Prefecture, Japan.

The modern city of Kama was established on March 27, 2006, from the merger of the city of Yamada, and the towns of Inatsuki, Kaho and Usui (all from Kaho District).

The area has several Kofun, or Japanese burial mounds.

 Hifumi Katō (born 1940), retired Japanese professional shogi player who achieved the rank of 9-dan
Katsuto Momii (born 1943),Japanese businessman who was elected as NHK's 21st Director-General
 Kōji Seto (born 1988), Japanese actor, singer and member of D-BOYS
 Emi Takanabe (born 1985), Japanese swimmer, who specialized in freestyle events
 Kōhei Tsuka (1948–2010), Korean-Japanese playwright, theater director, and screenwriter (Real Name: Kim Pongung, Hangul: 김봉웅)

References

External links

Kama City official website 

 
Cities in Fukuoka Prefecture